Ebru Özkan (born 18 November 1978) is a Turkish actress.

Life and career 
Ebru Özkan was born on 18 November 1978 in Ankara. She completed her primary school education in Ankara and secondary and high school education in Nevşehir. She settled in Istanbul after her high school education. She started her university education as a scholarship student at Bilkent University, then continued at Ankara University's School of Language and History – Geography and graduated from there. She started her theatre education at primary school level and first wrote a play called Milli Piyango. While continuing her university education, she started acting in the TV series Gözyaşı Çetesi. She also had a number of modeling jobs.

Özkan rose to prominence with her role as Halide in Hanımın Çiftliği. She continued her television career with the series Not Defteri, where she played the character of Suna. She played the character of Dilara in the series Paramparça, which was broadcast between 2014 and 2017 and lasted for 3 seasons. In 2018, she played the character of Melek in the TV series Şahin Tepesi. Later, she had the role of İpek Tekin in Hekimoğlu, the Turkish adaptation of the House, M.D. series. In 2021, she was awarded the best actress award by the Radio and Television Journalists Association for her role as İpek Tekin. The award was presented by President Recep Tayyip Erdoğan. She then shared the lead role with Erdal Beşikçioğlu in the TV series Hakim, which is an adaptation of Your Honor.

Together with Timuçin Esen, with whom she shared the leading role in the Hekimoğlu series, she appeared in the Disney+ series Ben Gri. In 2023, she portrayed a mystical character named Çavgeş in the Netflix original series Shahmaran.

Personal life 
She married Ertan Saban in 2016 and they had a daughter named Biricik Saban in 2018.

Filmography 
Film

Television

 Web series/films

Theatre

References

External links
 

1978 births
Turkish female models
Turkish film actresses
Turkish television actresses
Actresses from Ankara
Living people
21st-century Turkish actresses